Dan J. Marlowe (1917 – 1986) was an American writer of crime fiction.
Gunshots in Another Room: The Forgotten Life of Dan J. Marlowe (2012) by Charles Kelly, tells the story of Marlowe, his amnesia, his involvements with bank robber Albert Frederick Nussbaum and with murderer Bobby Randell Wilcoxson.

Works

Novels

Fastback "easy readers"
 1983: Janie
 1984: No Witnesses, A Game for Fools
 1985: Claire, The Comeback, Game Day, Redmond's Shot, Turk, Death in Any Language, Pension Plan
 1986: Small Town Beat, No Loose Ends
 1987: The Devlin Affair, Ship of Doom, Double the Glory, The Hitter, The Mudder, The Sixth Man, The Super Upset, Big-Top Tragedy, Deadly Torrent, Quake 8.1

References

External links

 
 Mystery Man: Dan J. Marlowe

20th-century American novelists
American crime fiction writers
American male novelists
1917 births
1986 deaths
20th-century American male writers
Writers from Lowell, Massachusetts
Novelists from Massachusetts